John Elward (born 6 April 1935) is a former  Australian rules footballer who played with Hawthorn in the Victorian Football League (VFL).

Honours and achievements 
Individual
 Hawthorn life member

Notes

External links 

Living people
1935 births
Australian rules footballers from Victoria (Australia)
Hawthorn Football Club players